The Women's 200m Breaststroke event at the 2003 Pan American Games took place on August 13, 2003 (Day 12 of the Games).

Medalists

Records

Results

Notes

References
usaswimming
Records

Breaststroke, Women's 200m
2003 in women's swimming
Swim